SmartQVT is a full Java open-source implementation of the QTV-Operational language which is dedicated to express model-to-model transformations. This tool compiles QVT transformations into Java programs to be able to run QVT transformations. The compiled Java programs are EMF-based applications. It is provided as Eclipse plug-ins running on top of the EMF metamodeling framework and is licensed under EPL.

Components 
SmartQVT contains 3 main components:
 a code editor: this component helps the user to write QVT code by highlighting key words.
 a parser: this component converts QVT code files into model representations of the QVT programs (abstract syntax).
 a compiler: this component converts model representations of the QVT program into executable Java programs.

See also 

 Meta-Object Facility (MOF): a language to write metamodels
 Model transformation language
 Model-driven architecture (MDA)

Programming tools
Free software programmed in Java (programming language)